Mohamed Douik  is a Moroccan professional footballer who plays as a midfielder.

References

Living people
1999 births
Moroccan footballers
Association football midfielders
Raja CA players